
Gmina Narol is an urban-rural gmina (administrative district) in Lubaczów County, Subcarpathian Voivodeship, in south-eastern Poland.

The gmina contains parts of the protected areas called South Roztocze Landscape Park and Puszcza Solska Landscape Park.

Villages
Apart from the town of Narol, Gmina Narol contains the villages and settlements of Bieniaszówka, Chlewiska, Dębiny, Huta Różaniecka, Huta-Złomy, Jędrzejówka, Kadłubiska, Lipie, Lipsko, Łówcza, Łukawica, Narol-Wieś, Piła, Płazów, Podlesina, Ruda Różaniecka, Wola Wielka and Złomy Ruskie.

Neighbouring gminas
Gmina Narol is bordered by the gminas of Bełżec, Horyniec-Zdrój, Lubycza Królewska, Obsza, Susiec and Tomaszów Lubelski.

References

Polish official population figures 2006

Narol
Lubaczów County